Mobile Suit Gundam: Gundam vs. Gundam Next is the next game in the Gundam VS video game series from Namco Bandai Games, it is the sequel to Mobile Suit Gundam: Gundam vs. Gundam. On September 15, 2009, Famitsu released gameplay screenshots of the PSP version, Mobile Suit Gundam: Gundam vs. Gundam NEXT PLUS, which was released on December 3, 2009. A sequel, Mobile Suit Gundam: Extreme Vs. was released in 2011.

System Changes

All the features from the previous title remain, including all player-usable units, with the exception that G-Crossover has been removed. A new system Next Dash, which can cancel moves instantly was introduced. Automatic blocking has been replaced by manual blocking. The music theme for Z Gundam, Gundam Wing, Gundam SEED, Gundam SEED Destiny, and Gundam 0083 are changed. Music theme for Gundam 00 has been added, and an additional theme has been added for Mobile Suit Gundam.

References

 https://www.youtube.com/watch?v=LUGOv0xSUcU&feature=channel

External links
 Official website for arcade version 
 Official website for PSP version 

2009 video games
Arcade video games
Capcom games
Banpresto games
Bandai Namco games
Gundam video games
Japan-exclusive video games
Video games about mecha
PlayStation Portable games
Video games developed in Japan